Joseph Tsai (born January 1964) is a Taiwanese-Canadian billionaire businessman, lawyer, and philanthropist. He is a co-founder and executive vice chairman of the Chinese multinational technology company Alibaba Group and owns the Brooklyn Nets of the American National Basketball Association (NBA), the New York Liberty of the Women’s National Basketball Association (WNBA), the San Diego Seals of the National Lacrosse League, and has interests in several other professional sports franchises. Tsai holds Hong Kong and Canadian passports. Tsai's net worth is estimated to be US$8.1 billion.

Early life
Tsai was born in Taipei, Taiwan, to Paul C. Tsai (d.2013), a second-generation lawyer, and Ruby Tsai. He has three younger siblings: Eva, Vivian, and Benjamin. 

The Tsai family had escaped to Taiwan as part of the Kuomintang exodus after the communists took over control of Mainland China in 1949 during the Chinese Civil War. At age 13, Tsai was sent to the U.S. to attend the Lawrenceville School in Lawrenceville, New Jersey, where he played both lacrosse and football (inside linebacker) and was a member of Cleve House. Tsai enrolled at his father's alma mater, Yale University. He played for the Yale varsity lacrosse team for four years and has remained a supporter of the team.

Tsai earned a B.A. in economics and East Asian studies from Yale College in 1986. In 1990, he earned a J.D. from Yale Law School, where he was articles editor of the Yale Law & Policy Review.

Career
Tsai became a tax associate at the white-shoe law firm of Sullivan & Cromwell after graduation and was admitted as an attorney to the New York bar on 6 May 1991. After three years at the law firm, he switched to private equity and joined Rosecliff, Inc., a small management buyout firm based in New York, as vice president and general counsel. He left for Hong Kong in 1995 to join the Swedish Wallenberg family's investment conglomerate Investor AB, where he was responsible for its Asian private equity investments.

It was in this role that he first met Jack Ma in 1999 in Hangzhou after being introduced by a friend who was trying to sell his own company to Ma. Tsai was impressed with Ma's idea to create an international import and export marketplace, as well as his charismatic personality, but it was Ma's followers and their energy and enthusiasm that ultimately convinced Tsai. Later that year he quit the $700,000-a-year job at Investor AB and offered to join Ma as a member of the founding team for almost nothing. At the time each of Alibaba's 18 co-founders—of which Tsai was the only Western-educated member—accepted a salary of only $600 a year. He served as chief operating officer, chief financial officer, and founding board member. He single-handedly established Alibaba's financial and legal structure, since no other member of the team had any experience in venture capital or law. In May 2013, he became Alibaba's executive vice chairman. He has become the second-largest individual shareholder of Alibaba after Ma.

Sports ownership
In September 2019, Tsai became the owner of the Brooklyn Nets of the NBA and chairman of Barclays Center. He initially invested in the NBA team in October 2017, purchasing a 49% stake in the Nets from Russian billionaire Mikhail Prokhorov in a deal that valued the team at $2.3 billion, with the option to buy the remaining stake of the team no later than 2021. Tsai exercised that option in August 2019, and at the same time, bought the Nets' arena from Prokhorov for nearly $1 billion in a separate deal.

Tsai's ownership in the Nets includes the Long Island Nets of the NBA G League and the Nets Gaming Crew of the NBA 2K League. In January 2019, Tsai headed a group that bought the WNBA's New York Liberty from The Madison Square Garden Company. 

As a lacrosse varsity player at Yale, Tsai is also an avid supporter of the lacrosse sport. He is the owner of the San Diego Seals, and a co-owner of the Las Vegas Desert Dogs, both of which are professional box lacrosse teams in the National Lacrosse League (NLL). Tsai co-owns the 15th NLL franchise, the Las Vegas Desert Dogs with Wayne Gretzky, Dustin Johnson, and Steve Nash with the team based in Las Vegas. 

He is also chairman of J Tsai Sports with investments in the upstart field lacrosse league, the Premier Lacrosse League and several sports media and technology companies based in North America and Asia. Tsai made his investment in the Premier Lacrosse League in February 2019, along with The Chernin Group and The Raine Group, helping fund the new lacrosse league founded by lacrosse player Paul Rabil and his brother Mike Rabil.

In March 2018, Tsai joined a Michael Rubin-led group to buy the Carolina Panthers. The bid was ultimately unsuccessful.

Tsai is also an investor in Major League Soccer franchise Los Angeles FC.

Personal life
Tsai holds Canadian and Hong Kong dual citizenship spending much of his time in Vancouver and Hong Kong. Wu spent her childhood in Lawrence, Kansas and is a graduate of Lawrence High School. Wu also graduated from Stanford University, where she studied international relations, and has an MBA degree from Harvard Business School. She is an advisor for Taobao and is a member of The Bishop's School board of trustees. Tsai and Wu have three children. They lived in Hong Kong for over a decade, though now primarily reside in the La Jolla neighborhood of San Diego, California. Tsai still spends much of his time in Hong Kong for business and still has a home in Hong Kong. In January 2022, Tsai paid $188 million for a penthouse at 220 Central Park South.

Politics
On 7 October 2019, Tsai weighed in after Houston Rockets general manager Daryl Morey posted a tweet supporting protesters in Hong Kong. In an open letter to all NBA fans on his Facebook page, Tsai explained, with reference to historical foreign invasions of China, that Morey's tweet triggered a strong negative sentiment in China because of strong national sentiment against territorial losses, especially those perceived to have been caused or escalated by foreign entities, and separatist movements.

Philanthropy
In March 2016, Tsai donated $30 million to his alma mater, Yale Law School, in honor of his father to support the continuing work of the Law School's China Center and renamed it Paul Tsai China Center.

In May 2017, Tsai and his wife, through the Joe and Clara Tsai Foundation, made another donation to Yale for the construction, launch, and programs of the center and named it Tsai Center for Innovative Thinking. The center’s mission is to inspire students from diverse backgrounds and disciplines to seek innovative ways to solve real-world problems. 

In June 2017, the Tsais, again through the Joe and Clara Tsai Foundation, made a donation to his high school, the Lawrenceville School, in Mercer County, New Jersey, which was the single largest gift the school ever received. Tsai is a member of Lawrenceville's board of trustees.

In late March and early April 2020 during the COVID-19 pandemic, the Tsais donated 2.6 million masks, 170,000 goggles and 2,000 ventilators to New York. On 20 April 2020, they donated $1.6 million of medical supplies to hospitals in San Diego.

In August 2020, the Tsais donated $50 million to social justice and economic equality initiatives to support BIPOC causes.

In late 2020, the Tsais committed to contribute $50 million to Lincoln Center and the New York Philharmonic to facilitate the accelerated acoustical renovation of David Geffen Hall. On August 3, 2022, Lincoln Center and the New York Philharmonic announced the naming of the concert hall as the Wu Tsai Theater, as well as the naming of a Wu Tsai Series of concerts celebrating interdisciplinary works from diverse voices.

In February 2021, the Tsais made a donation to Yale University to establish the Wu Tsai Institute which will launch an ambitious research enterprise devoted to the study of human cognition.

In July 2021, the Tsais debuted the Wu Tsai Human Performance Alliance and pledged US$220 million to the foundation to fund teams of experts and academics from Stanford University, the University of Kansas, the University of Oregon, University of California, San Diego, Boston Children's Hospital and the Salk Institute for Biological Studies.

Awards 
In 2017, Tsai received the George H.W. Bush '48 Lifetime of Leadership Award from Yale University.

References

1964 births
Living people
Alibaba Group people
Brooklyn Nets owners
Canadian billionaires
Canadian chief executives
Canadian computer businesspeople
20th-century Canadian lawyers
Canadian sports businesspeople
Hong Kong billionaires
Hong Kong businesspeople
Hong Kong legal professionals
Hong Kong sports executives and administrators
Lawrenceville School alumni
New York Liberty owners
Sullivan & Cromwell associates
Taiwanese emigrants to Canada
Taiwanese expatriates in Hong Kong
Yale Bulldogs men's lacrosse players
Yale Law School alumni
Asia Game Changer Award winners
People named in the Pandora Papers
Yale College alumni